The Glenlyon Range is a mountain range in the Yukon, Canada. It has an area of 2589 km2 and is a subrange of the Pelly Mountains which in turn form part of the Yukon Ranges.

See also
List of mountain ranges

References

Mountain ranges of Yukon